Yasin Öztekin (born 19 March 1987) is a Turkish professional football player who plays as a winger for Göztepe. He has previously played in Borussia Dortmund's academy and youth teams.

Club career

Borussia Dortmund 
Yasin Oztekin played his youth career in Borussia Dortmund II from 2006 to 2010. During 2010–2011 season Yasin Oztekin was offered a role in the A squad but later was sent to the youth team of Dortmund.

Gençlerbirliği 
On 5 January 2011 Yasin Oztekin signed a deal with Gençlerbirliği for 21 years on a free transfer. On 12 January 2011 he played his first game in the campaign's against Bucaspor and on 16 January 2011 he scored an own goal in the campaign's against Yeni Malatyaspor. Yasin played 50 games in 1.5 years and scored 8 league goals, which later attracted bigger clubs to target Yasin in the transfer market.

Trabzonspor
On 22 May 2012 Yasin Oztekin had signed a 4-year deal with Trabzonspor on a free transfer. While playing for Trabzonspor he played 23 games and scored only 3 goals during 2012–2013 Turkish Super League season.

Kayseri Erciyesspor
On 22 July 2013 Yasin Oztekin was sent to Kayseri Erciyesspor for a fee of 417 Euros and signed a contract for 3 years. During that season Yasin had played 28 league matches and was able to score 6 goals.

Galatasaray
On 9 August 2014 Yasin Oztekin was sold to the Turkish giants Galatasaray for a fee of 2.5 million Euros and signed a contract for 4 years. On 21 February 2015 Yasin scored a fantastic goal in the 9th minute against Sivasspor. On 5 April 2015 Yasin Scored his second goal of the season against Kardemir Karabükspor. On 12 May 2015 Yasin scored an incredible goal in the 16th minute winning over Mersin İdman Yurdu. On 24 May 2015 Yasin scored a critical goal in the 11th minute against Beşiktaş, which led to the win over Besiktas and securing the 2014–15 Süper Lig title.

International career
On 8 June 2015 he made his international debut for Turkey in a 4–0 home friendly win against Bulgaria. He played the first half before being substituted for his club teammate Selçuk İnan.

Honours

Club
Galatasaray
Süper Lig: 2014–15, 2017–18
Türkiye Kupası: 2014–15, 2015–16
 Süper Kupa: 2015, 2016

References

External links

 
 
 

1987 births
Footballers from Dortmund
German people of Turkish descent
Living people
German footballers
Turkish footballers
Turkey international footballers
Association football midfielders
Borussia Dortmund players
Borussia Dortmund II players
Gençlerbirliği S.K. footballers
Trabzonspor footballers
Kayseri Erciyesspor footballers
Galatasaray S.K. footballers
Göztepe S.K. footballers
Sivasspor footballers
Samsunspor footballers
Regionalliga players
Bundesliga players
3. Liga players
Süper Lig players
TFF First League players